Daoviang Butnakho (also spelled Daovieng Boudnakho; 3 August 1954 – 6 March 2019), was a famous Laotian writer, poet, journalist, musician and songwriter in the genres Luk thung and Phleng Phuea Chiwit. He won the National Artist award from Laos in 2011.

Early life
He was born in Khong District, Champasak Province, Laos. He was a son of Ngiem and Khampan Butnakho. He has eleven siblings.

Career

Daoviang Butnakho started work as a journalist in Laotian newspaper Suksa Mai, and wrote many novels, poets and articles.

In 1992, he started working as a musician and songwriter, and was successful. He wrote songs for The Supphies, a Laotian rock music band.

In 1996, Butnakho started to write songs in the genre Luk thung in Laos. He composed for successful Laotian artists including Daeng Douangduean, Bounkerd Niuhuang, Ki Daophet Niuhuang, Kee Morakot, and Xaiyo Kotamee.

In 2002, he wrote the song Kaem Daeng Raeng Jai, which was sung by Tai Orathai.

In 2007, Isan music became  very popular in Laos and he stopped songwriting. During his time as a composer, he composed more than 500 songs.

Death
Butnakho died on 6 March 2019 from diabetes in a hospital in Champasak Province, aged 64.

Discography

Songwriting
Kee Morakot
 Doi San Sai Tai (ໂດຍສານສາຍໃຕ້)
 Phoo Ying Klang Kuen (ຜູ້ຍິງກາງຄືນ)

Bounkerd Niuhuang
 Sao Simueang (ສາວສີເມືອງ)
 Sao Dong Doak (ສາວດົງໂດກ)
 Sao Takieng Noi (ສາວຕະກຽງນ້ອຍ)
 Kam Paeng Hak (ກຳແພງຮັກ)

Noay Maneechothkaewsi
 Phoo Chay Play Thaew (ຜູ້ຊາຍປາຍແຖວ)

Xaiyo Kotamee
 Kam Paeng Nguen (ກຳແພງເງິນ)

Ki Daophet Niuhuang
 Larw Khaw Larw Lao (ເຫຼົ້າຂາວເຫຼົ້າລາວ)
 Sao Sri Vienetane (ສາວສີວຽງຈັນ)
 Namta Look Phoo Xay (ນ້ຳຕາລູກຜູ້ຊາຍ)
 Sao Xe Bangphay (ສາວເຊບັ້ງໄຟ)

Daeng Duangduean
 Ying Khonnan Maen Phay (ຍິງຄົນນັ້ນແມ່ນໃຜ)
 Nong Nao (ນ້ອງຫນາວ)

Tai Orathai
 Kaem Daeng Raeng Jai (แก้มแดงแรงใจ)

In popular culture
In 1999, Komphet Phorncharoen wrote a song titled "Namta Sao Warin" (น้ำตาสาววาริน), which was sung sang by the Isan singer Jintara Poonlarp. The melody came from the pattern of "Sao Simueang", which was written by Butnakho and sang by Bounkerd Niuhuang.

In 2002, Sala Khunnawut covered two songs by Butnakho for the album Phleng Dang Song Fang Khong  by Mike Phiromphon.

References

1954 births
2019 deaths
Laotian writers
Laotian musicians
Laotian novelists
Laotian poets
Laotian songwriters
Deaths from diabetes